The Ratas Island lizard, Podarcis lilfordi rodriquezi, is an extinct subspecies of Lilford's wall lizard that once lived on Ratas Island, a tiny, rocky island in the bay of Mahón, Menorca (Spain). But Ratas island, which was its habitat, was destroyed when Port Mahon was rebuilt. The last sign of this subspecies was in 1950 and is presumed extinct. Four specimens of this European lizard are conserved in museum collections.

See also 
 List of extinct animals of Europe

References 
 David Day, 1981, The Doomsday Book of Animals, Ebury Press, London.

External links 
 The Sixth Extinction - Species Info - Ratas Island Lizard

Extinct animals of Europe
Reptile extinctions since 1500
Lizards of Europe
Extinct reptiles
Endemic fauna of the Balearic Islands
Species made extinct by human activities
Taxa named by Lorenz Müller